Panagiotis Tsintotas (born 4 July 1993) is a Greek professional footballer who plays as a goalkeeper for Super League club PAS Giannina.

Club career

Levadiakos
On January transfer window of 2012, he joined Levadiakos from Football League club Pierikos. On 26 April 2015, he made his debut for the first team in a home game against Atromitos.

AEK Athens
On 24 June 2017, Tsintotas joined AEK Athens from the Super League on a three-year contract. On 1 October 2017 he made his Super League debut in a 2–0 away defeat against Asteras Tripolis.
On 7 December 2017, he made his international debut, playing with the club as a starter in a 0–0 away UEFA Europa League game against Austria Wien helping AEK to secure point needed to join Milan in round of last 32 in Europa League.

According to various sources, AEK’s goalie, Tsintotas, is expected to be in Michael Skibbe’s call-ups for Greece’s upcoming friendlies in March. He has been exceptional for AEK since taking over as the club’s new #1 after Giannis Anestis’ relations with the club took a wrong turn, leaving him sidelined since January. Michael Skibbe is expected to call-up Tsintotas for Greece’s upcoming friendlies in March against Switzerland and Egypt as the national team prepares for the UEFA Nations League, which kicks off in September.

On 29 August 2018, Tsintotas agreed to a contract extension with AEK, until the summer of 2023. In November 2022 his contract with the club was terminated.

PAS Giannina
On 27 November 2022, he signed for PAS Giannina in Superleague Greece until the end of the season.

Career statistics

Club

Honours
AEK Athens
Superleague: 2017–18
Greek Cup: Runner-Up (3) 2017–18, 2018–19, 2019–20

References

External links
 
 

1993 births
Living people
Greek footballers
Greece youth international footballers
Association football goalkeepers
Pierikos F.C. players
Levadiakos F.C. players
AEK Athens F.C. players
PAS Giannina F.C. players
Super League Greece players
Football League (Greece) players
Footballers from Katerini
21st-century Greek people